Following the end of World War II, most railways throughout the world were looking to either update their fleet of steam locomotives with new and more economical designs or look towards alternatives, which for many meant a programme of dieselisation. The main considerations were the rising cost of coal against diesel oil and the weight of the trains causing wear and tear on the track. In looking to the dieselisation of their system the Ulster Transport Authority (UTA) made early inroads with small, lightweight diesel units, based on those built for the Great Western Railway in England, using the same manufacturers to supply parts and undertaking construction in their own workshops.

History
AEC (Associated Equipment Company Limited) of Southall, London were a well known bus chassis, engine and body builders responsible for many types of London's famous red buses. They also provided engines for many diesel railcars built for, or by, the Great Western Railway and later British Railways. In the early 1950s, with dieselisation being undertaken on the GNR(I) and the UTA systems, their products were supplied to both companies.

In August 1951 UTA's York Road works outshopped two new power cars which, following on the first diesel acquisitions, were numbered 6 and 7. They lasted well, 15 July 1966 seeing their last recorded working, after which they were not used again, although not officially withdrawn. On the formation of NIR they were included in the stock transferred over, to be officially withdrawn in December 1968. To increase capacity the unit ran with coach 279, as a centre trailer car, which was converted to work with this set. It became 528 in 1958.

At the same time, (1950/1), AEC were also responsible for power cars supplied to the GNR(I) and on the division of stock of that company in 1958 ten of these entered the UTA lists. Numbered from 111 to 120 inclusive they were, in order, originally GNR(I) No's. 603/602/607/606/611/610/615/614/619/618. Trailers from these railcars were converted from existing GNR steam coaches and retained their GNR numbers (Except vehicles 8 and 9, later UTA 585+586, which were built new as AEC driving trailers). Those that were acquired by UTA became 554 555 580 581 582 585 586 593 (The gaps being due to their numbering in the same series as BUT trailers). Kitchen Car 166 was converted to an AEC trailer in 1967 and retained its number

Withdrawal
All NIR AEC railcars were withdrawn by 1972. The last set in service was 114-586-115 stopped in September of that year

No's 6 & 7 were involved in the Lisburn accident on 5 February 1963 (which also involved Class WT, No.2) and were sent to Dunluce Street for repairs.

Technically, and theoretically, No's. 6 and 7 were compatible with 111 - 120 but never ran with them.

AEC
AEC vehicles
Scrapped locomotives